John Thomas Griffith (born April 3, 1960) is an American singer-songwriter best known as a guitarist and vocalist for the band Cowboy Mouth. Griffith first established himself on the American music scene in the early 1980s as lead singer and guitarist for the new wave band Red Rockers, co-writing their 1983 MTV hit "China".

Griffith was born in Lubbock, Texas, and raised in Houston, Southern California, New Jersey, and eventually New Orleans. In Louisiana, while attending LSU in Baton Rouge, he began his professional musical career. Finding a base in New Orleans, Griffith and local friends, James Singletary and Darren Hill, founded the early punk rock band, Red Rockers. After a short but successful career highlighted by the 1983–84 MTV hits, "China" and, "Good as Gold", singles from its album Good As Gold (Columbia/415,1983), multi arena tours with U2, Joan Jett, Men at Work and B-52s, Red Rockers disbanded in early 1987....

The departure led Griffith to release his first solo album, Son of an Engineer, in 1988 on Laughing Gravy Music. After a brief stab at solo-dom, opening twice for Bob Dylan, Griffith was approached by fellow New Orleanians, Fred LeBlanc and Paul Sanchez, in fall 1990. Griffith and Sanchez were already performing as The Lonesome Travelers, in 1989.

Since 1990, Griffith has been a founding member, resident guitar slinger, vocalist, and principal songwriter for the New Orleans based rock group, Cowboy Mouth. In 2019, Cowboy Mouth will make a 29th consecutive New Orleans Jazz and Heritage Fest performance, and Griffith a 31st.

Known by most of his fans as "JTG" or "Griff", John Thomas Griffith was inducted into Buddy magazine's Texas Guitar Hall of Fame in 1999, joining Billy Gibbons of ZZ Top, Eric Johnson, and others.

When not touring with Cowboy Mouth, he performs living room concerts throughout the USA, composes and licenses music for film and TV through his company, iSourceMusic, with his side project, Black Ant King.

Griffith resides in Northern California.

Discography

With Red Rockers

Albums
 Condition Red (1981)
 Good as Gold (1983)
 Schizophrenic Circus (1984)

With Cowboy Mouth

Albums
 Word of Mouth (1992)
 It Means Escape (1994)
 Are You with Me? (1996)
 Word of Mouth (Remix!) (1996)
 Mercyland (1998)
 Easy (2000)
 Uh-Oh (2003)
 Voodoo Shoppe (2006)
 Fearless (2008)
 This Train (2011)
 Go (2014)

Live albums and EPs
 Mouthin' Off (Live & More) (1993)
 Mouthin' Off (Live & More) (remastered) (1997)
 Cowboy Mouth LIVE! (limited edition 5-song EP issued with Mercyland) (1998)
 Live in the X Lounge – "Jenny Says" (1998)
 All You Need Is Live (2000)
 Live in the X Lounge – "Easy" (2000, 2001)
 Uh Oh (5-song preview EP) (2003)
 Live at the Zoo (2004)
 Mardi Gras (2010)

Live DVD
 The Name of the Band is Cowboy Mouth (2007)

Solo albums
 Son of an Engineer (1987)
 Lonesome Travelers (2000)
 Aluminum (2001)
 Lonesome Travelers – Chicago Live (2003)
 Apples and Onions (2005)

References

External links

 Official website

Cowboy Mouth members
Living people
1960 births
American alternative rock musicians
American male singer-songwriters
American male pop singers
American rock guitarists
American male guitarists
American rock singers
American rock songwriters
Musicians from New Orleans
People from Lubbock, Texas
People from Houston
Alternative rock guitarists
Male new wave singers
Singer-songwriters from Texas
Singer-songwriters from Louisiana
Guitarists from Louisiana
Guitarists from Texas
20th-century American guitarists
20th-century American male musicians